Dobrinja may refer to the following places:

 Dobrinja, neighborhood of Sarajevo
 Dobrinja, Jablanica, village in Jablanica municipality, Bosnia and Herzegovina
 Dobrinja (Modriča), village in Modriča municipality, Bosnia and Herzegovina
 Dobrinja (Požega), village in Požega municipality, Serbia, whence Prince Miloš Obrenović came from